Following is a list of historic canals that were once used for transportation in Ohio.

 Hocking Canal - Branch of Ohio and Erie Canal
 Miami and Erie Canal
 Ohio and Erie Canal
 Pennsylvania and Ohio Canal
 Sandy and Beaver Canal
 Wabash and Erie Canal
 Walhonding Canal
 Warren County Canal - Branch of Miami Erie Canal

See also
 Canal
 List of canals in the United States
 Canal boat
 Ohio

External links
 Ohio DNR Plat map of Canals
 Ohio's Historic Canals
 Ohio Canal Map
 Miami & Erie Canal Corridor Association
 Lockington Locks Ohio Historical Society

 
History of Ohio